The 1996–97 Copa México was the 67th staging of the Copa México and the 40th staging in the professional era. The competition did not return until 2012.

The competition started on June 28, 1996, and concluded on August 3, 1996, with the final, in which Cruz Azul lifted the trophy for second time ever, with a 2-0 victory over Toros Neza.

For this edition was played by 33 teams, between Primera División and Primera División A, where the group winners advance to the semi-finals.  In the qualifying round, a penalty shutout follows if tie after regulation. the group stage was a 1-game serie.

Group stage

Group 1
Teams from Primera División: Atlante F.C., Celaya, Morelia, Toros Neza, Pachuca and Toluca
Teams from Primera División A: Cruz Azul Hidalgo, Irapuato and San Luis

Group 2
Teams from Primera División: Atlas, Guadalajara, León and Tecos UAG
Teams from Primera División A: Hermosillo, La Piedad, San Francisco and Tijuana

Group 3
Teams from Primera División: Club América, Monterrey and Santos Laguna
Teams from Primera División A: Saltillo, Tampico Madero, Tigres UANL, Correcaminos UAT and U. de N.L.

Group 4
Teams from Primera División: Cruz Azul, Necaxa, Puebla, Pumas UNAM and Veracruz
Teams from Primera División A: Acapulco, Marte and Zacatepec

Championship round

Final

References
Mexico - Statistics of Copa México for the 1996–97 season. (RSSSF)

Copa MX
Cup
1996–97 domestic association football cups